Karin Konoval (born June 4, 1961) is Canadian-American actress who has appeared in theatre, numerous TV series and supporting lead roles in many feature films. Her screen credits include Maurice the Orangutan in Rise of the Planet of the Apes, Dawn of the Planet of the Apes, and War for the Planet of the Apes, recurring roles in Snowpiercer and The Good Doctor, and the lead role of Mary Leonard in Cable Beach.

Early life
Konoval was born in Baltimore, Maryland, and raised in Canada in Edmonton, Alberta. She trained as a dancer until she was 16. She graduated from the University of Alberta with a Bachelor of Arts, studying English and Theatre History. She relocated to Vancouver to attend theatre school in 1981 for two years.

Other projects 
Besides acting she also paints, writes short stories and she designed choreography and sound for theatre productions.

Author 
Her writing has appeared in anthologies and magazines, including Exact Fare Only II (Anvil Press), Other Voices (Alberta literary anthology), Playboard magazine, The Courier and Live To Imagine (writing contest anthology). It has been broadcast on CBC radio. She wrote and illustrated her first book "Jeffrey Takes a Walk in December" in 2015.

Filmography

Film

Television

References

External links
 
 
 
  at Hollywood.com

1961 births
21st-century American actresses
Actresses from Baltimore
Living people
Motion capture actresses
Writers from Baltimore
University of Alberta alumni